Alain Marc (born 29 January 1957) is a member of the French Senate, who represents the department of Aveyron.

He was elected to the Senate on 28 September 2014. Marc served in the National Assembly of France from 2007 to 2014, representing the third constituency of the Aveyron department,  as a member of the Radical Party.

References

1957 births
Living people
Politicians from Paris
Radical Party (France) politicians
Union for a Popular Movement politicians
Union of Democrats and Independents politicians
Deputies of the 13th National Assembly of the French Fifth Republic
Deputies of the 14th National Assembly of the French Fifth Republic
French Senators of the Fifth Republic
Senators of Aveyron
Members of Parliament for Aveyron